Avid Free DV is a non-linear editing video editing software application which was made by Avid Technology. Avid discontinued this product, stating: "Effective September 1, 2007, Avid is discontinuing the Avid Free DV application offer, and has no immediate plans to make an updated version available."

It was intended to give editors a sample of the Avid interface to use in deciding whether or not to purchase Avid software, so when compared with other Avid products its features were relatively minimal. When it was available it was not limited by time or watermarking, so it could be used as a non-linear editor for as long as desired.

Comparisons
When compared with other consumer-end non-linear editors such as iMovie and Windows Movie Maker, it sported more powerful video processing tools, but lacked the ease-of-use and shallow learning curve emphasized in similar programs because it had the full interface of the professional Avid system.  However, Avid did offer a number of flash-based tutorials to help new users learn how to use the program for capturing, editing, clipping, processing, and outputting audio/video, among other things.

Limitations
The limitations of Avid Free DV included that it allowed only two video and audio tracks, had fewer editing tools than other Avid products, had few import and export formats, and allowed capture and output of standard-definition DV only, via firewire.  Avid Free DV projects and media were not compatible with other Avid systems.

As the name implied, Avid Free DV was available as a free download, although users were required to complete a short survey on the Avid website before they were given a download link and key.

In addition to using Free DV to evaluate Avid prior to purchase, it could also act as a stepping stone for people wishing to learn to use Avid's other editing products, such as Xpress Pro, Media Composer and Symphony. While additional skills and techniques are necessary to use these professionally geared systems, the basic operation remains the same.

Operating systems
Avid Free DV was available for Windows XP and Mac OS X: Officially supported Mac OS X versions: Panther versions up to 10.3.5, and Tiger versions up to 10.4.3 only.

Supported formats
Avid Free DV supported QuickTime (MOV) and DV AVIs.

References

External links

Archive of official website on Archive.org

Video editing software